David Hough may refer to:

David L. Hough (born 1937), American writer on motorcycle safety, education and training
David Hough (politician) (1753–1831), U.S. Representative from New Hampshire

See also
David Huff (disambiguation)